Vera is a town in Washington County, Oklahoma, United States.  The population was 334 as of the 2020 census.

History
Originally known as Evans, the town was renamed Vera in November 1899 and incorporated in 1904. Vera lies seven miles southeast of Ramona and two miles east of U.S. Highway 75. Vera started out as a farming community, with the chief crops being corn and hay. Lining the railroad track east of town were hay barns and a grain elevator. After many bountiful harvests of the local prairie hay Vera earned the nickname "the Hay Capital of the World."

Geography
Vera is located at  (36.448946, −95.880248).

Demographics

As of the census of 2010, there were 241 people, 84 households, and 56 families residing in the town. There were 89 housing units at an average density of 384.4 per square mile (148.6/km2). The racial makeup of the town was 75.1% White, 9.5% Native American, and 15.4% from two or more races.

There were 84 households, out of which 28.6% had children under the age of 18 living with them, 53.6% were married couples living together, 6.0% had a female householder with no husband present, and 33.3% were non-families. 23.8% of all households were made up of individuals, and 10.7% had someone living alone who was 65 years of age or older. The average household size was 2.58 and the average family size was 3.04.

In the town, the population was spread out, with 30.3% under the age of 18, 9.0% from 18 to 24, 29.8% from 25 to 44, 21.3% from 45 to 64, and 15.4% who were 65 years of age or older. The median age was 37 years. For every 100 females, there were 113.6 males. For every 100 females age 18 and over, there were 105.8 males.

The median income for a household in the town was $27,000, and the median income for a family was $32,083. Males had a median income of $30,000 versus $20,833 for females. The per capita income for the town was $12,013. About 6.4% of families and 9.1% of the population were below the poverty line, including 9.1% of those under the age of eighteen and 12.5% of those 65 or over.

References

Towns in Washington County, Oklahoma
Towns in Oklahoma
Tulsa metropolitan area